Gaeolaelaps is a genus of mite.

Species
 Gaeolaelaps aculeifer (Canestrini, 1883)
 Gaeolaelaps angusta (Karg, 1965)
 Gaeolaelaps angustiscutatus (Willmann, 1951)
 Gaeolaelaps deinos (Zeman, 1982)
 Gaeolaelaps glabrosimilis (Hirschmann, Bernhard, Greim & Gotz, 1969)
 Gaeolaelaps iranicus Kavianpour & Nemati, in Kavianpour, Nemati, Gwiazdowicz & Kocheili, 2013
 Gaeolaelaps kargi (Costa, 1968)
 Gaeolaelaps minor (Costa, 1968)
 Gaeolaelaps nolli (Karg, 1962)
 Gaeolaelaps oreithyiae (Walter & Oliver, 1989)
 Gaeolaelaps praesternalis (Willmann, 1949)
 Gaeolaelaps queenslandicus (Womersley, 1956)

References

External links
 Encyclopedia of Life entry

Laelapidae
Acari genera